David II succeeded his father to the throne of the Kingdom of Tashir-Dzoraget. He ruled with his brother Abbas I. Faced with expansion of Seljuq Turks and  Bagratid Georgians, he transferred his capital to Matsnaberd in 1111, where he ruled till 1118.

He was succeeded by his son Kiurike III and grandson Abbas II. However, they did not have the prestige or strength of their ancestors. Upon the death of Abbas II, his sister Borin raised her son Agsartan to be heir. He in turn fathered the last member of the family Kiurike IV, who died without being succeeded.

References

Further reading
 

11th-century births
12th-century deaths
Kings of Tashir-Dzoraget
Kiurikian dynasty
Year of birth unknown